"Graduate" is a song by American rock band Third Eye Blind from their eponymous debut studio album (1997). It was released to radio as the second single from the album in July 1997 by Elektra Records. Frontman Stephan Jenkins and guitarist Kevin Cadogan are credited as co-writers on the song. Production on the song was helmed by Jenkins and Eric Valentine. According to Jenkins, the song is about the band's experience after being signed to a major record label.

The song reached number 26 on the Hot Mainstream Rock Tracks chart in the U.S., and number 14 on the Hot Modern Rock Tracks chart. Additionally, it was featured in the 1998 film Can't Hardly Wait starring Seth Green and Jennifer Love Hewitt. The band played the song at the 25th Annual American Music Awards, changing some of the lyrics to "can I masturbate" in place of "can I graduate." In 2011 former Third Eye Blind members Cadogan and Arion Salazar performed the song and made an unofficial video.

Writing and inspiration
"Graduate" was written by frontman Stephan Jenkins and guitarist Kevin Cadogan. According to Cadogan, the song originated from a bandmate jokingly saying the phrase "It's ready to roll!!", with Jenkins then crafting the lyrics "can I graduate?" in the same style. In an interview with Billboard, Jenkins said that the concept of the song was developed through the band's experience as they tried to get signed by a major record label. He further explained the meaning of the song:
"Graduate" is about after we got signed, and it’s the process of getting signed. I’m still standing in front of some suit at a record company asking permission. I felt like some kind of lap-dancer, some student again, like I was still in high school. Can I get my grade on my paper? What it's really saying is "I’m not really asking if i can graduate. I'm not asking for your permission. I'm beyond your permission. I'm beyond your control.

Composition
According to the sheet music published at Musicnotes.com by Alfred Publishing, the song is written in the key of D major and is set in time signature of common time with a tempo of 141 beats per minute. Jenkins's vocal range spans one octave, from A4 to B5.

Chart performance
In the United States, "Graduate" peaked at number 26 on Billboard's Mainstream Rock chart.

Live performances
The song was performed at the 25th Annual American Music Awards, with the band substituting the lyric "can I graduate" with "can I masturbate". Third Eye Blind performed the song alongside Billy Idol at the 1998 KROQ Weenie Roast. In January 2020, the band performed the song as a duet with Yungblud at the Roxy Theatre. Jenkins has acknowledged that "Graduate" is a staple on their performance set lists, further commenting: "I'm not sick of [playing] it because the audience, they ignite off of it."

In popular culture
The song was featured in the film and on the soundtrack to the 1998 American teen romantic comedy film Can't Hardly Wait.

Track listings and formats

European CD single
"Graduate"  – 3:08
"Graduate" (remix) – 3:25
"Horror Show"  – 4:00
Australian CD single
"Graduate"  – 3:12
"Semi-Charmed Life" (clean version) – 3:43
"Semi-Charmed Life"  – 4:30
"Graduate" (remix) – 3:27

Japanese CD single
"Graduate"  – 3:08
"Semi-Charmed Life" (clean version) – 3:42
"Semi-Charmed Life"  – 4:27
7–inch vinyl
"Graduate"  – 3:08
"Horror Show"  – 4:00

Credits and personnel
Credits and personnel are adapted from the Third Eye Blind album liner notes.
Stephan Jenkins – writer, vocals, percussion, producer
Kevin Cadogan – writer, guitar, vocals
Arion Salazar – bass, vocals
Brad Hargreaves – drums
Eric Valentine – engineering, producer, mixing
Ted Jensen – mastering

Charts

Release history

References

1997 singles
Song recordings produced by Eric Valentine
Songs written by Stephan Jenkins
Songs written by Kevin Cadogan
Third Eye Blind songs